is a racing driver from Japan who currently competes in  Super Formula Lights and Super GT. He was previously competed in 2020 F4 Japanese Championship and become the champion.

Career
Taira started professional racing in 2019, competed in F4 Japanese Championship with TOM'S Spirit. He managed to claimed 7th in the standings. He continues to race in the same series, but switched to the TGR-DC Racing School. In that year, he wins the championship title with massive 10 wins. The next season, Taira promoted to 2021 Super Formula Lights with TOM'S. He managed to claimed 5th in the standings. Also in 2021, he competed in Super GT with K-Tunes racing but for couple of races

Racing Record

Career summary

Complete F4 Japanese Championship results
(key) (Races in bold indicate pole position; races in italics indicate points for the fastest lap of top ten finishers)

Complete Super Formula Lights results 
(key) (Races in bold indicate pole position) (Races in italics indicate fastest lap)

References

External links
 

2000 births
Living people
Japanese racing drivers
Japanese Formula 3 Championship drivers
Super GT drivers
TOM'S drivers
Team Meritus drivers
Toyota Gazoo Racing drivers
Japanese F4 Championship drivers